"Friends" is a song by the American hip-hop group Whodini. The song reached #4 on the U.S. Billboard Hot R&B/Hip-Hop Songs chart. The song was less successful on the Hot 100, spending 3 weeks on the chart and peaking at #87.

Chart performance

Samples
The song was interpolated in Nas's song If I Ruled The World (Imagine That).
The song was sampled on the Nickelodeon sitcom Taina on the song "Thought that we were friends", sung by Christina Vidal who played the title character.
The song was also sampled by Will Smith for the track "Potnas" on his 1999 album Willennium.
MF DOOM sampled it for the track "Deep Fried Frenz" on his 2004 album Mm...Food.

References

External links
Genius: Friends - Lyrics

1984 singles
Whodini songs
Electro songs
1984 songs
Jive Records singles